Jim Kalberloh is an American politician serving as a member of the Missouri House of Representatives. Elected in November 2020 from the 125th district, he assumed office on January 6, 2021. After redistricting in 2022, he was reelected from district 126.

Early life and education 
Kalberloh was born in Appleton City and raised on a farm in Lowry City, Missouri. He graduated from Lakeland High School and earned a diploma in farm management from Platt College (now Northwest Missouri State University).

Career 
Outside of politics, Kalberloh owns a restaurant and works as a cattle farmer. He also served as a member of the Missouri National Guard for 21 years and was deployed to Afghanistan in 2003 and 2004. He was elected to the Missouri House of Representatives in November 2020 and assumed office on January 6, 2021.

Electoral History

State Representative

References 

Living people
Republican Party members of the Missouri House of Representatives
People from Appleton City, Missouri
People from Lowry City, Missouri
People from St. Clair County, Missouri
Year of birth missing (living people)